William E. Cooper was President of the University of Richmond from July 1, 1998, through June 30, 2007.  He subsequently served as Distinguished University Professor and President Emeritus.  Immediately prior to coming to the University of Richmond, Cooper served as Executive Vice President for the Main Campus at Georgetown University.  He has also held faculty positions at Harvard University, the University of Iowa, and Tulane University, where he served as Dean of the Faculty of Liberal Arts and Sciences.

Education
Cooper received his bachelor's and master's degrees (1973) from Brown University and his Ph.D. (1976) in Cognitive Studies from Massachusetts Institute of Technology.

References

External links
 William Cooper - Psychology - University of Richmond

Living people
People from Baltimore
Massachusetts Institute of Technology School of Science alumni
University of Richmond faculty
Presidents of the University of Richmond
Georgetown University faculty
Harvard University faculty
Tulane University faculty
University of Iowa faculty
Brown University alumni
Year of birth missing (living people)